Juan Ismael Calzada is a Mexican botanist and collector. Dr  Calzada is credited with the discovery of the elm Ulmus ismaelis, named in his honour.

Partial works 
 El estropajo. Xalapa Instituto Nacional de Investigaciones sobre Recursos Bioticos. 1982. INIREB informa 52

References 

Year of birth missing (living people)
Living people
Mexican botanists
National Autonomous University of Mexico